"Saturday" is a song by American indie rock band Yo La Tengo, released as the second single from their 2000 album And Then Nothing Turned Itself Inside-Out. It reached number 92 in the UK Singles Chart.

Legacy 

PopMatters included the song in their list "Popular Songs: 15 (Or So) Essential Yo La Tengo Tracks", writing, "The centerpiece of 2000's mood-heavy And Then Nothing Turned Itself Inside-Out, 'Saturday' is Yo La Tengo's most striking foray into something resembling electronic music."

References 

2000 singles
Yo La Tengo songs
2000 songs